Cosmopolitan may refer to:

Food and drink
 Cosmopolitan (cocktail), also known as a "Cosmo"

History
 Rootless cosmopolitan, a Soviet derogatory epithet during Joseph Stalin's anti-Semitic campaign of 1949–1953

Hotels and resorts
 Cosmopolitan of Las Vegas, a luxury resort casino and hotel in Las Vegas, Nevada, which opened in December 2010
 Cosmopolitan Hotel in Hong Kong

Internationalism
 World citizen, one who eschews traditional geopolitical divisions derived from national citizenship
 Cosmopolitanism, the idea that all of humanity belongs to a single moral community
 Cosmopolitan localism, a way of linking local communities in global networks that bring production and consumption closer together

Media
 Cosmopolitan (magazine), a magazine for women, sometimes referred to as "Cosmo"
 Cosmopolitan (film), a 2003 film starring Roshan Seth
 Cosmopolitan Television, a satellite/cable television channel
 Cosmopolitan Productions, a defunct United States film production company

Science
 Cosmopolitan distribution, in biogeography, biological categories which can be found almost anywhere around the world
 Cosmopolitan (Vanessa cardui or painted lady, a butterfly
 Cosmopolitan (Leucania loreyi or false army worm, a moth

Vehicles
 CC-109 Cosmopolitan, an aircraft, the RCAF version of the Canadair CL-66
 Cosmopolitan automobile company, a defunct American car maker
 Nash Cosmopolitan, a defunct car model from Nash Motors

See also
 Cosmo (disambiguation)
 Cosmopolite (disambiguation)